BD+20°307 is a close binary star system approximately 300 light-years away in the constellation Aries. The system is surrounded by a dusty ring, and probably orbited by a 0.48 white dwarf on a wide (980 AU) orbit.

The dust that orbits around several hundred main-sequence stars is cold and comes from a Kuiper-belt analogous region. In the Solar System the ongoing collisions between asteroids generate a tenuous cloud of dust known as the zodiacal light. When the Solar System was young such collisions were more common and the rate of dust production was probably many times higher. Zodiacal dust around stars much younger than the Sun has been rarely found. Only a few main-sequence stars have revealed warm (>120 K) zodiacal dust.

An exceptionally large amount of warm, small, silicate dust particles around the solar-type star BD+20°307 (HIP 8920, SAO 75016) has been reported. The composition, quantity and temperature of the dust may be explained by recent, frequent or huge collisions between asteroids or other planetesimals whose orbits are being perturbed by a nearby planet.

Spectroscopic binary
Both stars of the close binary are considered to be Solar-type stars that are slightly more massive than the Sun. The two stars differ in effective temperature by only ~250 K and have a mass ratio of 0.91. The two orbit a common center of mass every 3.42 days. Within the spectra of the two stars the Li lines show different equivalent widths. The Li 6707 Å line though weak is detected only from the primary star, suggesting that it is older than 1 Gyr. If so, the large amount of zodiacal dust around the binary must be from a very large and recent collision of planetesimals.

Age
Recent measurements indicate that the binary star system has an age of several billion years — comparable to the Solar System.

Dust cloud
The dust cloud orbiting BD+20°307 has about 1 million times more dust than is orbiting the Sun. Furthermore, the dust is made up of extremely tiny particles, and its temperature is over 100 K, which is unusually high. It is hypothesized that, within the past few hundred thousand years and perhaps much more recently, these particles were formed by a collision between two bodies similar to Earth. "It's as if Earth and Venus collided," said Prof. Benjamin Zuckerman, UCLA professor of physics and astronomy. "Astronomers have never seen anything like this before. Apparently, major catastrophic collisions can take place in a fully mature planetary system." This hypothesis explains why the bulk of this dust has not spiraled into BD+20°307, or been pushed out by stellar winds yet. The National Science Foundation (NSF), NASA, Tennessee State University (TSU) and the State of Tennessee funded the work by Zuckerman and his collaborators.

Sun-like stars with hot dust
As of 2006 there were 7 sun-like stars that have hot dust at < 10 AU. These are

See also 

 Disrupted planet
 Eta Corvi
 HD 12039
 HD 69830
 HD 98800
 HD 113766
 List of stars that dim oddly
 Pi1 Ursae Majoris

References

External links 
 Rayl, A.J.S. (2005). Extrasolar Planets: Could Dusty Star Be Harboring a Young Earth in the Making?  Retrieved July 21, 2005.
 BD+20°307
  UCLA Newsroom >  Research > News Releases > Worlds in collision Retrieved September 27, 2008.

Aries (constellation)
Circumstellar disks
G-type main-sequence stars
008920
BD+20 307
J01545034+2118225
IRAS catalogue objects
Spectroscopic binaries